"Skies the Limit" is a single released in 1990 by British-American band Fleetwood Mac, from their album Behind the Mask. While the single did not chart on the US Billboard Hot 100, it did reach number 10 on the Billboard Adult Contemporary chart and number 40 on the Mainstream Rock chart. The moderate success of "Skies the Limit" and "Save Me" helped to push their parent album into the US and Canadian top 20, albeit only briefly.

"Skies the Limit" was the only track from Behind the Mask included on The Very Best of Fleetwood Mac 2-CD Set in 2002.

Track listings
US 7-inch vinyl and cassette single (7-19867, 9 19867-4)
A. "Skies the Limit" – 3:42
B. "The Second Time" – 2:30

German 7-inch single (5439-19740-7)
A. "Skies the Limit" – 3:45
B. "Lizard People" – 4:48

German maxi-single (7599-21709-2)
 "Skies the Limit" (LP) – 3:45
 "Little Lies" (live) – 4:14
 "The Chain" (live) – 5:12

Personnel
Fleetwood Mac
 Christine McVie – keyboards, synthesizer, lead vocals
 Stevie Nicks – backing vocals
 Billy Burnette – rhythm guitar, backing vocals
 Rick Vito – lead guitar, backing vocals
 John McVie – bass guitar
 Mick Fleetwood – drums, tambourine, hand drum, wind chimes
Additional personnel
 Steve Croes – additional keyboards

Charts

Weekly charts

Year-end charts

References

1990 songs
Fleetwood Mac songs
Songs written by Christine McVie
Songs written by Eddy Quintela
Warner Records singles